The Delta 1000 series (also referred to as Straight-Eight) was an American expendable launch system which was used to conduct eight orbital launches between 1972 and 1975. It was a member of the Delta family of rockets. Several variants existed, differentiated by a four digit numerical code. Delta 1000 was developed by McDonnell Douglas company (now — Boeing) in 1972. 

The same first stage and boosters were used on all variants. The first stage was an Extended Long Tank Thor, a further stretched version of the Long Tank Thor used on earlier versions, itself derived from the Thor missile. Four, six or nine Castor-2 solid rocket boosters were attached to increase thrust at lift-off.  These improvements permitted the Delta 1000 series to lift 1,835 kg (4,045 lbs) to LEO or 635 kg (1,400 lbs) to GTO.

The nickname "Straight-Eight" comes from the fact that its second stage variants had the same 8 ft. (2.4 m) diameter as the first stage; previous Delta second stages were smaller in diameter. Two different second stages were flown, depending on the variant:
 The Delta-F second stage, featuring the Aerojet AJ10-118G engine, was flown on three launches, with Explorer 47, 50 and 51; the Aerojet engine was flown for the (Anik A1) satellite launch (mistakenly marked as xx1x in Delta 1000 series)
 The Delta-P second stage, featuring the new TRW TR-201 engine, was used for two launches each in 1973 and 1975.

Some flights used a third stage, either the Thiokol Star-37D or Star-37E, for launches beyond low Earth orbit. One probe launched by the Delta 1000 series, Delta 1913, was Explorer 49 that was placed into lunar orbit on 10 June 1973.

Delta 1000 rockets were launched from Space Launch Complex 2W at Vandenberg AFB and Launch Complex 17B at Cape Canaveral. All eight (1972-1975) launches were successful.

Launching from LC-17B was had resulted successful removal of the exploitor-47 spacecraft for the study of the Earth's magnetosphere. During the first stage a carrier rocket was used in the modification of Delta-1604 with the onboard number 579/D90.

The Japanese N-II and H-I launch vehicles used the same Extended Long Tank Thor first stage. For the second stage, the N-II used the Delta-F while the H-I had the Japanese LE-5 engine which used liquid hydrogen and oxygen.

References

Delta (rocket family)